"Love Is All Around" is a song by Agnes, who was the winner of Swedish Idol 2005. The song was composed by Fredrik Thomander and Anders Wikström. It has been covered in at least 3 other continents.

Ricki-Lee Coulter version 

"Love Is All Around" was covered by Australian singer-songwriter, Ricki-Lee Coulter. It served as the second single released from her second album Brand New Day on November 10, 2007. It debuted on the ARIA Singles Chart at number five. The music video was directed by Fin Edquist and filmed at the Ferris Wheel in Birrarung Marr, Melbourne. The video depicts Coulter at a theme park, showing examples of love in all forms, such as love between couples and families.

Track listing 
 "Love Is All Around" - 3:26
 "Love Is All Around" (Rok Coalition mix) - 4:22
 "It's Just Life" - 5:16
 "Love Is All Around" (Acappella) - 3:22
 "Love Is All Around" (Instrumental) - 3:36
 "Love Is All Around" (Rok Coalition Extended Remix) - 7:51

Credits and personnel
Credits adapted from the liner notes of Ricki-Lee: The Singles.

Locations
Mixed at Sing Sing Studios.
Mastered at Stepford Audio.

Personnel
Songwriting – F. Thomander, A. Wikström 
Production and engineering – Epicentre
Additional production – Glenn Cunningham
Background vocals – Ricki-Lee Coulter, Carmen Smith, Glenn Cunningham
Mixing – Tony Espie
Mastering – Dave Walker

Other versions 
 The song was covered by Japanese boyband, Arashi, and was retitled "We Can Make It!". It featured the same melody, but its lyrics were not a direct translation, and a rap part was included. The song was also featured as the opening theme song of Bambino!, a Japanese TV drama series. It debuted at the top of the Japanese charts upon its release on May 2, 2007.
 The song was also covered by Soraya Arnelas, a singer from Spain who included it in her fourth studio album, Sin Miedo
 The song was also covered by Sing Shi Xin Hui, a well known singer in both Singapore and Malaysia. The song was retitled to "命中注定" meaning "Fated" featuring the same melody, but the lyrics differed from Love Is All Around. The song was also included in her tenth album, Truly, which was released on May 17, 2010.

Jody version 

"Love Is All Around" was covered by South African singer Jody Williams, who released it as the first single from her debut album Just Gonna Be Me. It was released on December 10, 2007.

The song was scheduled as the "winner's song" in the fourth season of Idols (South Africa) and was performed by both Jody and competition runner-up, Andriëtte Norman. On December 9, 2007, Jody won the show and sung out the finale with the song. A day later on December 10, 2007 it was released on CD in South Africa with "Dance with My Father" as the CD's B-side - a song Jody performed on Idols which was originally done by singer Luther Vandross.

Background and success 
"Love Is All Around" features as a bonus track on Jody's debut album Just Gonna Me. The song was ironically released a month before as a single by Australian Idol Ricki Lee. Jody's cover of the song features distinctly different effects to it, turning a pop song into what was described as "an urbanised version" of the Agnes original. Jody's version also differs in length, being the longest of all covers of the song so far.

"Love Is All Around" was released as a CD single a day after Jody won South African Idols. It was sold out on the first day and accumulated Gold status in South Africa after selling 30,000 copies. The song also reached #1 on AF Stereo's "South African Airplay Chart"

Charts

References

2006 songs
2007 singles
Agnes (singer) songs
Ricki-Lee Coulter songs
Songs written by Fredrik Thomander
Sony BMG singles
Songs written by Anders Wikström (songwriter)